Paul Caruso (1 June 1955 – 3 May 2006) was a drummer who played for the Boston band The Atlantics.

Caruso joined the Atlantics in 1979, as a replacement for Ray 'Boy' Fernandes, and played on the group's best selling record Lonelyhearts.
He co-produced and played a drum instrumental on the song "Mercy" from Joe Perry's album Joe Perry which was nominated for a Grammy.
He also appeared on Late Night with Conan O'Brien as a drummer for Perry roughly a year before his death.
Caruso was also an engineer on two Aerosmith albums, Just Push Play in 2001 and Honkin' on Bobo in 2004.

He collapsed and died aged 50 at his home in Kingston. He was survived by his wife, Susan, and two sons, Christian and Zachary.

References

1956 births
2006 deaths
20th-century American drummers
American male drummers
20th-century American male musicians